Tucumán may refer to:
 San Miguel de Tucumán, the capital of the Argentinian province Tucumán
 Tucumán Province, a province in Argentina
 The Atlético Tucumán, a soccer team
 The Tucumán Rugby Club
 The Republic of Tucumán
 Tucumán amazon, a South American parrot
 Tucumán mountain finch. a South American tanager
 ARA Tucumán, an Argentine Navy Mendoza-class destroyer